Awapuni is a suburb of the New Zealand city of Gisborne, located in the southwest of the city. It is named after the Awapuni lagoon, where the Waipaoa River runs into the ocean. The New Zealand Ministry for Culture and Heritage gives a translation of "blocked-up river" for Awapuni.

The local Awapuni Pā, also known as Te Kuri a Tuatai, is a tribal meeting place of the Rongowhakaata hapū of Ruapani, Ngāi Tāwhiri and Te Whānau a Iwi. It includes the Whareroa meeting house.

Demographics

Makaraka-Awapuni had a population of 969 at the 2018 New Zealand census, an increase of 141 people (17.0%) since the 2013 census, and an increase of 105 people (12.2%) since the 2006 census. There were 345 households, comprising 504 males and 465 females, giving a sex ratio of 1.08 males per female. The median age was 44.6 years (compared with 37.4 years nationally), with 171 people (17.6%) aged under 15 years, 159 (16.4%) aged 15 to 29, 459 (47.4%) aged 30 to 64, and 180 (18.6%) aged 65 or older.

Ethnicities were 74.0% European/Pākehā, 38.1% Māori, 3.7% Pacific peoples, 3.4% Asian, and 2.2% other ethnicities. People may identify with more than one ethnicity.

The percentage of people born overseas was 11.5, compared with 27.1% nationally.

Although some people chose not to answer the census's question about religious affiliation, 50.5% had no religion, 35.0% were Christian, 2.5% had Māori religious beliefs, 0.6% were Hindu, 0.6% were Buddhist and 2.2% had other religions.

Of those at least 15 years old, 117 (14.7%) people had a bachelor's or higher degree, and 186 (23.3%) people had no formal qualifications. The median income was $29,400, compared with $31,800 nationally. 102 people (12.8%) earned over $70,000 compared to 17.2% nationally. The employment status of those at least 15 was that 417 (52.3%) people were employed full-time, 111 (13.9%) were part-time, and 27 (3.4%) were unemployed.

Parks

Awapuni has three sports grounds: Awapuni Stadium, the Oval Reserve cricket and rugby ground, and Watson Park.

Midway Beach includes a beach, barbecue area, horse riding area, jet skiing area, kite surfing area, dog walking area, and the Kopututea Sand Dunes.

Adventure Playground includes a picnic area and public toilets.

Education

References

Suburbs of Gisborne, New Zealand